Judge Vazquez may refer to:

John Michael Vazquez (born 1970), judge of the United States District Court for the District of New Jersey
Martha Vázquez (born 1953), judge of the United States District Court for the District of New Mexico